Christine Idris Smith (13 December 1946 – 8 May 1979) was an Australian alpine skier. She has been described as a "long-haired blonde with an 'all-Australian girl next door' image."

Born in Cooma, Smith learned to ski at an early age. She was a "stylish and aggressive skier" who competed in the 1962 Commonwealth Winter Games and won the Thredbo Cup in Australia in 1963–64. At the 1964 Winter Olympics, Smith came 27th out of 43 in the downhill. She also came 28th and last in the slalom and was disqualified in the giant slalom. Her performances were affected by the death of a fellow competitor Ross Milne.

In 1965, while recuperating from a ski accident in Europe, she was enlisted to teach The Beatles to ski for their film Help!, and performed in the movie in a short skiing sequence. Smith competed in the World Ski Championships in Chile in 1966, and taught skiing at Thredbo and other venues before establishing  an interior design business in 1974. In 1977 she married Wayne Arthur Garland.

In 1979, Smith committed suicide by swallowing chloral hydrate and paracetamol with salicylic acid.

References

1946 births
1979 suicides
Olympic alpine skiers of Australia
Alpine skiers at the 1964 Winter Olympics
Drug-related suicides in Australia
People from Cooma
Australian female alpine skiers
Suicides in New South Wales
Sportswomen from New South Wales
20th-century Australian women